Ana Maria Rodriguez is a Republican member of the Florida Senate, representing the 39th district encompassing Monroe and parts of Miami-Dade Counties since 2020.

Previously, she served one term in the Florida House of Representatives, representing parts of Broward, Collier, and Miami-Dade counties from 2018 until her election to the Senate.

Biography
The daughter of Cuban immigrants, Rodríguez has lived her entire life in South Florida. Prior to entering politics, Rodríguez was a lobbyist for Baptist Health South Florida and the Miami Association of Realtors. Before her election to the Florida House of Representatives, Rodriguez served on the Doral City Council.

Legislative career
Rodriguez was elected to the Florida House of Representatives in the November 6, 2018 general election, narrowly defeating Democrat Javier Estevez with 50.44% of the vote.

In 2020, Rodriguez ran for the Florida Senate seat vacated by Anitere Flores, who was term-limited. She was unopposed in the Republican primary and defeated Democratic State Representative Javier Fernandez in the general election, 55.6 to 42.8%.

References

External links

|-

Republican Party members of the Florida House of Representatives
Hispanic and Latino American state legislators in Florida
Living people
21st-century American politicians
Florida International University alumni
Nova Southeastern University alumni
Politicians from Miami
1977 births
Women state legislators in Florida
21st-century American women politicians
Hispanic and Latino American women in politics
Latino conservatism in the United States